The Grand Bassin is a body of water along the Canal du Midi in Castelnaudary, France.

Grand Bassin may also refer to:

Ganga Talao, or Grand Bassin, a lake in Savanne district, Mauritius
Grand Bassin – Le Dimitile Important Bird Area, Réunion island